Coquitlam City Hall is the home of Coquitlam City Council in Coquitlam, British Columbia, Canada. It is located at the intersection of Pinetree Way and Guildford Way in the Town Centre neighbourhood.

City Hall is part of a two-building complex built in the campus, the other being Public Safety Building which houses the Royal Canadian Mounted Police (RCMP) detachment.

Both buildings were designed by Grant & Sinclair Architects Limited and completed in 2001.

City Hall

Home to Coquitlam City Council in a three-storey  complex housing council chambers, city office space and a public library.

Public Safety Building

The  complex is home to the city's other department and an RCMP detachment.

References

Buildings and structures in Coquitlam
City and town halls in British Columbia